The 2019 Stanford Cardinal men's soccer team represented Stanford University during the 2019 NCAA Division I men's soccer season. They will be led by eight year head coach Jeremy Gunn. The Cardinal enter the season after coming up short of a fourth straight championship, losing to Akron in the quarterfinals 2-3 of the NCAA Tournament.

Background

Offseason

2019 recruiting class 
Source:

Departures

Roster

Schedule

Spring season

Regular season

NCAA Tournament

Goals record

Disciplinary record

2020 MLS Super Draft

Awards and honors

Rankings

References

2019
Stanford Cardinal
Stanford Cardinal
Stanford Cardinal men's soccer
Stanford Cardinal
2019 Stanford Cardinal